The 1884 West Virginia gubernatorial election took place on October 14, 1884, to elect the governor of West Virginia.

Results

Other sources give different vote totals.

References

1884
gubernatorial
West Virginia
October 1884 events